This Vast Land is a historical novel written by American author Stephen Ambrose.  Published in 2003 by Simon & Schuster Children's Publishing, it a fictionalized account in the form of a diary written by George Shannon, the youngest member of the Lewis and Clark Expedition.  The book details the expedition from the view of Shannon, who although beginning the expedition as the most inexperienced member, slowly matures into one of the expedition's most important figures.

2003 American novels
American historical novels
Cultural depictions of Meriwether Lewis and William Clark
Books by Stephen Ambrose
Novels set in the 1800s
Novels published posthumously